Jesucristo Esthil Kote López (born 15 August 1990), better known as Jhony, is an Equatoguinean footballer who plays as a striker, who currently plays for BSV Hürtürkel in the NOFV-Oberliga Nord (Germany). He also holds Spanish citizenship.

Career
In January 2010, Jhony was on trial in the Segunda División B side San Roque, but he failed to stay. Nevertheless, he signed for the Tercera División side Antequera in the following month.

International career
In July 2010, he received his first call for the Equatoguinean senior team and to play a friendly match against Morocco on 11 August 2010. Jhony was substitute and replaced Pedro Obama in the 85th minute.

References

External links
Jhony at FuPa.net

Fútbol estadísticas 

1990 births
Living people
Sportspeople from Malabo
Equatoguinean footballers
Association football forwards
Antequera CF footballers
Tercera División players
Divisiones Regionales de Fútbol players
Equatorial Guinea international footballers
Equatoguinean expatriate footballers
Equatoguinean expatriate sportspeople in Spain
Equatoguinean expatriates in Germany
Expatriate footballers in Spain
Expatriate footballers in Germany
CD Canillas players